Cerro Arenas is a mountain in the Andes of Santiago Metropolitan Region, Chile. It is located west of San José volcano and east of Cerro El Morado. The latter mountain lies on the opposite side of the valley of the Estero Morado, a headwater stream of the Volcán River.

References

Mountains of Chile
Mountains of Santiago Metropolitan Region
Principal Cordillera